This is a list of bird species confirmed in Canada. Unless otherwise noted, the list is that of Bird Checklists of the World as of July 2022. Of the 703 species listed here, 235 are accidental. Twelve species were introduced to North America or directly to Canada, three species are extinct, and three (possibly four) have been extirpated. One species of uncertain origin is also included.

This list is presented in the taxonomic sequence of the Check-list of North and Middle American Birds, 7th edition through the 63rd Supplement, published by the American Ornithological Society (AOS). Common and scientific names are also those of the Check-list, except that the common names of families are from the Clements taxonomy because the AOS list does not include them.

Canadian birds most closely resemble those of Eurasia, which was connected to the continent as part of the supercontinent Laurasia until around 60 million years ago. Many families which occur in Canada are also found throughout the Northern Hemisphere or worldwide. However, some families are unique to the New World; those represented in this list are the hummingbirds, the New World vultures, the New World quail, the tyrant flycatchers, the mimids, the wood-warblers, the cardinals, and the icterids. Three species on the list (Ross's goose, whooping crane, and Harris's sparrow) breed only in Canada. The extinct Labrador duck is also believed to have been a breeding endemic, though its breeding areas are not known.

Unless otherwise noted, all species listed below are considered to occur regularly in Canada as permanent residents, summer or winter visitors, or migrants. These tags are used to annotate some species:

 (A) Accidental - a species that rarely or accidentally occurs in Canada
 (I) Introduced - a species introduced to Canada as a consequence, direct or indirect, of human actions
 (E) Extinct - a recent species which no longer exists
 (Ex) Extirpated - a species which no longer occurs in Canada but exists elsewhere

Population status symbols are those of the Red List published by the International Union for Conservation of Nature (IUCN). The symbols apply to the species' worldwide status, not their status solely in Canada. The symbols and their meanings, in increasing order of peril, are:

 = least concern
 = near threatened
 = vulnerable
 = endangered
 = critically endangered
 = extinct in the wild
 = extinct

Ducks, geese, and waterfowl

Order: AnseriformesFamily: Anatidae

The family Anatidae includes the ducks and most duck-like waterfowl, such as geese and swans. These birds are adapted to an aquatic existence with webbed feet, bills which are flattened to a greater or lesser extent, and feathers that are excellent at shedding water due to special oils.

Black-bellied whistling-duck, Dendrocygna autumnalis (A) 
Fulvous whistling-duck, Dendrocygna bicolor (A) 
Emperor goose, Anser canagica (A) 
Snow goose, Anser caerulescens 
Ross's goose, Anser rossii 
Greylag goose, Anser anser (A) 
Greater white-fronted goose, Anser albifrons 
Taiga bean-goose, Anser fabalis (A) 
Tundra bean-goose, Anser serrirostris (A) 
Pink-footed goose, Anser brachyrhynchus (A) 
Brant, Branta bernicla 
Barnacle goose, Branta leucopsis (A) 
Cackling goose, Branta hutchinsii 
Canada goose, Branta canadensis 
Mute swan, Cygnus olor (I) 
Trumpeter swan, Cygnus buccinator 
Tundra swan, Cygnus columbianus 
Whooper swan, Cygnus cygnus (A) 
Ruddy shelduck, Tadorna ferruginea (A) 
Common shelduck, Tadorna tadorna (A) 
Wood duck, Aix sponsa 
Baikal teal, Sibirionetta formosa (A) 
Garganey, Spatula querquedula (A) 
Blue-winged teal, Spatula discors 
Cinnamon teal, Spatula cyanoptera 
Northern shoveler, Spatula clypeata 
Gadwall, Mareca strepera 
Falcated duck, Mareca falcata (A) 
Eurasian wigeon, Mareca penelope 
American wigeon, Mareca americana 
Mallard, Anas platyrhynchos 
American black duck, Anas rubripes 
Mottled duck, Anas fulvigula (A) 
Northern pintail, Anas acuta 
Green-winged teal, Anas crecca 
Canvasback, Aythya valisineria 
Redhead, Aythya americana 
Common pochard, Aythya ferina (A) 
Ring-necked duck, Aythya collaris 
Tufted duck, Aythya fuligula (A) 
Greater scaup, Aythya marila 
Lesser scaup, Aythya affinis 
Steller's eider, Polysticta stelleri (A) 
Spectacled eider, Somateria fischeri (A) 
King eider, Somateria spectabilis 
Common eider, Somateria mollissima 
Harlequin duck, Histrionicus histrionicus 
Labrador duck, Camptorhynchus labradorius (E) 
Surf scoter, Melanitta perspicillata 
White-winged scoter, Melanitta deglandi 
Black scoter, Melanitta americana 
Long-tailed duck, Clangula hyemalis 
Bufflehead, Bucephala albeola 
Common goldeneye, Bucephala clangula 
Barrow's goldeneye, Bucephala islandica 
Smew, Mergellus albellus (A) 
Hooded merganser, Lophodytes cucullatus 
Common merganser, Mergus merganser 
Red-breasted merganser, Mergus serrator 
Ruddy duck, Oxyura jamaicensis

New World quail

Order: GalliformesFamily: Odontophoridae

The New World quails are small, plump terrestrial birds only distantly related to the quails of the Old World, but named for their similar appearance and habits.

Mountain quail, Oreortyx ictus (I) 
Northern bobwhite, Colinus virginianus 
California quail, Callipepla californica (I)

Pheasants, grouse, and allies

Order: GalliformesFamily: Phasianidae

Phasianidae consists of the pheasants and their allies. These are terrestrial species, variable in size but generally plump with broad relatively short wings. Many species are gamebirds or have been domesticated as a food source for humans.

Wild turkey, Meleagris gallopavo 
Ruffed grouse, Bonasa umbellus 
Greater sage-grouse, Centrocercus urophasianus 
Spruce grouse, Canachites canadensis 
Willow ptarmigan, Lagopus lagopus 
Rock ptarmigan, Lagopus muta 
White-tailed ptarmigan, Lagopus leucura 
Dusky grouse, Dendragapus obscurus 
Sooty grouse, Dendragapus fuliginosus 
Sharp-tailed grouse, Tympanuchus phasianellus 
Greater prairie-chicken, Tympanuchus cupido (Ex) 
Grey partridge, Perdix perdix (I) 
Ring-necked pheasant, Phasianus colchicus (I) 
Silver pheasant, Lophura nycthemera (I) (LC)
Chukar, Alectoris chukar (I)

Flamingos
Order: PhoenicopteriformesFamily: Phoenicopteridae

Flamingos filter-feed on shellfish and algae. Their oddly-shaped beaks are specially adapted to separate mud and silt from the food they consume and, uniquely, are used upside-down.

American flamingo, Phoenicopterus ruber (A)

Grebes

Order: PodicipediformesFamily: Podicipedidae

Grebes are small to medium-large freshwater diving birds. They have lobed toes and are excellent swimmers and divers. However, they have their feet placed far back on the body, making them quite ungainly on land.

Pied-billed grebe, Podilymbus podiceps 
Horned grebe, Podiceps auritus 
Red-necked grebe, Podiceps grisegena 
Eared grebe, Podiceps nigricollis 
Western grebe, Aechmophorus occidentalis 
Clark's grebe, Aechmophorus clarkii

Pigeons and doves
Order: ColumbiformesFamily: Columbidae

Pigeons and doves are stout-bodied birds with short necks and short slender bills with a fleshy cere.

Rock pigeon, Columba livia (I) 
Common wood pigeon, Columba palumbus (A)  
White-crowned pigeon, Patagioenas leucocephala (A) 
Band-tailed pigeon, Patagioenas fasciata 
Oriental turtle-dove, Streptopelia orientalis (A) 
Eurasian collared-dove, Streptopelia decaocto (I) 
Passenger pigeon, Ectopistes migratorius (E) 
Inca dove, Columbina inca (A) 
Common ground dove, Columbina passerina (A) 
White-winged dove, Zenaida asiatica (A) 
Mourning dove, Zenaida macroura

Cuckoos

Order: CuculiformesFamily: Cuculidae

The family Cuculidae includes cuckoos, roadrunners, and anis. These birds are of variable size with slender bodies, long tails, and strong legs.

Groove-billed ani, Crotophaga sulcirostris (A) 
Common cuckoo, Cuculus canorus (A) 
Yellow-billed cuckoo, Coccyzus americanus 
Black-billed cuckoo, Coccyzus erythropthalmus

Nightjars and allies
Order: CaprimulgiformesFamily: Caprimulgidae

Nightjars are medium-sized nocturnal birds that usually nest on the ground. They have long wings, short legs, and very short bills. Most have small feet, of little use for walking, and long pointed wings. Their soft plumage is cryptically coloured to resemble bark or leaves.

Lesser nighthawk, Chordeiles acutipennis 
Common nighthawk, Chordeiles minor 
Common poorwill, Phalaenoptilus nuttallii 
Chuck-will's-widow, Antrostomus carolinensis 
Eastern whip-poor-will, Antrostomus vociferus

Swifts
Order: ApodiformesFamily: Apodidae

The swifts are small birds which spend the majority of their lives flying. These birds have very short legs and never settle voluntarily on the ground, perching instead only on vertical surfaces. Many swifts have long swept-back wings which resemble a crescent or boomerang.

Black swift, Cypseloides niger 
White-collared swift, Streptoprocne zonaris (A) 
Chimney swift, Chaetura pelagica 
Vaux's swift, Chaetura vauxi 
Common swift, Apus apus (A) 
Pacific swift, Apus pacificus (A) 
House swift, Apus nipalensis  
White-throated swift, Aeronautes saxatalis

Hummingbirds

Order: ApodiformesFamily: Trochilidae

Hummingbirds are small birds capable of hovering in mid-air due to the rapid flapping of their wings. They are the only birds that can fly backwards.

Mexican violetear, Colibri thalassinus (A) 
Rivoli's hummingbird, Eugenes fulgens (A) (Not yet assessed by the IUCN)
Amethyst-throated mountain-gem, Lampornis amethystinus (A) 
Ruby-throated hummingbird, Archilochus colubris 
Black-chinned hummingbird, Archilochus alexandri 
Anna's hummingbird, Calypte anna 
Costa's hummingbird, Calypte costae (A) 
Calliope hummingbird, Selasphorus calliope 
Rufous hummingbird, Selasphorus rufus 
Broad-tailed hummingbird, Selasphorus platycercus (A) 
Broad-billed hummingbird, Cynanthus latirostris (A) 
Xantus's hummingbird, Basilinna xantusii (A)

Rails, gallinules, and coots

Order: GruiformesFamily: Rallidae

Rallidae is a large family of small to medium-sized birds which includes the rails, crakes, coots, and gallinules. Typically, family members occupy dense vegetation in damp environments near lakes, swamps, and rivers. In general they are shy and secretive birds, making them difficult to observe. Most species have strong legs and long toes which are well adapted to soft uneven surfaces. They tend to have short, rounded wings and to be weak flyers.

Clapper rail, Rallus crepitans (A) 
King rail, Rallus elegans 
Virginia rail, Rallus limicola 
Corn crake, Crex crex (A) 
Sora, Porzana carolina 
Common gallinule, Gallinula galeata 
Eurasian coot, Fulica atra (A) 
American coot, Fulica americana 
Purple gallinule, Porphyrio martinicus (A) 
Yellow rail, Coturnicops noveboracensis 
Black rail, Laterallus jamaicensis (A)

Limpkin

Order: GruiformesFamily: Aramidae

The limpkin is an odd bird that looks like a large rail, but is skeletally closer to the cranes. It is found in marshes with some trees or scrub in the Caribbean, South America, and southern Florida.

Limpkin, Aramus guarauna (A)

Cranes
Order: GruiformesFamily: Gruidae

Cranes are large, long-legged, and long-necked birds. Unlike the similar-looking, but unrelated, herons, cranes fly with their necks outstretched, not pulled back. Most have elaborate and noisy courting displays.

Sandhill crane, Antigone canadensis 
Common crane, Grus grus (C) 
Whooping crane, Grus americana

Stilts and avocets

Order: CharadriiformesFamily: Recurvirostridae

Recurvirostridae is a family of large wading birds which includes the avocets and stilts. The avocets have long legs and long up-curved bills. The stilts have extremely long legs and long, thin, straight bills.

Black-necked stilt, Himantopus mexicanus 
American avocet, Recurvirostra americana

Oystercatchers
Order: CharadriiformesFamily: Haematopodidae

The oystercatchers are large, obvious and noisy plover-like birds, with strong bills used for smashing or prying open molluscs.

Eurasian oystercatcher, Haematopus ostralegus (A) 
American oystercatcher, Haematopus palliatus (A) 
Black oystercatcher, Haematopus bachmani

Plovers  and lapwings

Order: CharadriiformesFamily: Charadriidae

The family Charadriidae includes the plovers, dotterels, and lapwings. They are small to medium-sized birds with compact bodies, short thick necks, and long, usually pointed, wings. They are found in open country worldwide, mostly in habitats near water.

Northern lapwing, Vanellus vanellus (A) 
Black-bellied plover, Pluvialis squatarola 
European golden-plover, Pluvialis apricaria (A) 
American golden-plover, Pluvialis dominica 
Pacific golden-plover, Pluvialis fulva (A) 
Eurasian dotterel, Charadrius morinellus (A) 
Killdeer, Charadrius vociferus 
Common ringed plover, Charadrius hiaticula 
Semipalmated plover, Charadrius semipalmatus 
Piping plover, Charadrius melodus 
Lesser sand-plover, Charadrius mongolus (A) 
Wilson's plover, Charadrius wilsonia (A) 
Snowy plover, Charadrius nivosus (A) 
Mountain plover, Charadrius montanus

Sandpipers and allies

Order: CharadriiformesFamily: Scolopacidae

Scolopacidae is a large, diverse family of small to medium-sized shorebirds including the sandpipers, curlews, godwits, shanks, tattlers, woodcocks, snipes, dowitchers, and phalaropes. The majority of these species eat small invertebrates picked out of the mud or soil. Different lengths of legs and bills enable multiple species to feed in the same habitat, particularly on the coast, without directly competing for food.

Upland sandpiper, Bartramia longicauda 
Bristle-thighed curlew, Numenius tahitiensis (A) 
Whimbrel, Numenius phaeopus 
Eskimo curlew, Numenius borealis (Possibly extinct) 
Long-billed curlew, Numenius americanus 
Far Eastern curlew, Numenius madagascariensis (A) 
Slender-billed curlew, Numenius tenuirostris (A) 
Eurasian curlew, Numenius arquata (A) 
Bar-tailed godwit, Limosa lapponica (A) 
Black-tailed godwit, Limosa limosa (A) 
Hudsonian godwit, Limosa haemastica 
Marbled godwit, Limosa fedoa 
Ruddy turnstone, Arenaria interpres 
Black turnstone, Arenaria melanocephala 
Great knot, Calidris tenuirostris (A) 
Red knot, Calidris canutus 
Surfbird, Calidris virgata 
Ruff, Calidris pugnax 
Sharp-tailed sandpiper, Calidris acuminata 
Stilt sandpiper, Calidris himantopus 
Curlew sandpiper, Calidris ferruginea (A) 
Temminck's stint, Calidris temminckii (A) 
Spoon-billed sandpiper, Calidris pygmaea (A) 
Red-necked stint, Calidris ruficollis (A) 
Sanderling, Calidris alba 
Dunlin, Calidris alpina 
Rock sandpiper, Calidris ptilocnemis 
Purple sandpiper, Calidris maritima 
Baird's sandpiper, Calidris bairdii 
Little stint, Calidris minuta (A) 
Least sandpiper, Calidris minutilla 
White-rumped sandpiper, Calidris fuscicollis 
Buff-breasted sandpiper, Calidris subruficollis 
Pectoral sandpiper, Calidris melanotos 
Semipalmated sandpiper, Calidris pusilla 
Western sandpiper, Calidris mauri 
Short-billed dowitcher, Limnodromus griseus 
Long-billed dowitcher, Limnodromus scolopaceus 
Jack snipe, Lymnocryptes minimus (A) 
Eurasian woodcock, Scolopax rusticola (A) 
American woodcock, Scolopax minor 
Common snipe, Gallinago gallinago (A) 
Wilson's snipe, Gallinago delicata 
Terek sandpiper, Xenus cinereus (A) 
Spotted sandpiper, Actitis macularius 
Solitary sandpiper, Tringa solitaria 
Grey-tailed tattler, Tringa brevipes (A) 
Wandering tattler, Tringa incana 
Lesser yellowlegs, Tringa flavipes 
Willet, Tringa semipalmata 
Spotted redshank, Tringa erythropus (A) 
Common greenshank, Tringa nebularia (A) 
Greater yellowlegs, Tringa melanoleuca 
Common redshank, Tringa totanus (A) 
Marsh sandpiper, Tringa stagnatilis (A) LC
Wood sandpiper, Tringa glareola (A) 
Wilson's phalarope, Phalaropus tricolor 
Red-necked phalarope, Phalaropus lobatus 
Red phalarope, Phalaropus fulicarius

Skuas and jaegers
Order: CharadriiformesFamily: Stercorariidae

Skuas are, in general, medium to large birds, typically with grey or brown plumage, often with white markings on the wings. They have longish bills with hooked tips and webbed feet with sharp claws. They look like large dark gulls, but have a fleshy cere above the upper mandible. They are strong, acrobatic fliers.

Great skua, Stercorarius skua (A) 
South polar skua, Stercorarius maccormicki 
Brown skua, Stercorarius antarcticus (A) LC
Pomarine jaeger, Stercorarius pomarinus 
Parasitic jaeger, Stercorarius parasiticus 
Long-tailed jaeger, Stercorarius longicaudus

Auks, murres, and puffins

Order: CharadriiformesFamily: Alcidae

Alcids are superficially similar to penguins due to their black-and-white colours, their upright posture, and some of their habits. However they are only distantly related to the penguins and are able to fly. Auks live on the open sea, only deliberately coming ashore to nest.

Dovekie, Alle alle 
Common murre, Uria aalge 
Thick-billed murre, Uria lomvia 
Razorbill, Alca torda 
Great auk, Pinguinus impennis (E) 
Black guillemot, Cepphus grylle 
Pigeon guillemot, Cepphus columba 
Long-billed murrelet, Brachyramphus perdix (A) 
Marbled murrelet, Brachyramphus marmoratus 
Kittlitz's murrelet, Brachyramphus brevirostris (A) 
Scripps's murrelet, Synthliboramphus scrippsi 
Guadalupe murrelet, Synthliboramphus hypoleucus (A) 
Ancient murrelet, Synthliboramphus antiquus 
Cassin's auklet, Ptychoramphus aleuticus 
Parakeet auklet, Aethia psittacula 
Least auklet, Aethia pusilla (A) 
Crested auklet, Aethia cristatella (A) 
Rhinoceros auklet, Cerorhinca monocerata 
Atlantic puffin, Fratercula arctica 
Horned puffin, Fratercula corniculata 
Tufted puffin, Fratercula cirrhata

Gulls, terns, and skimmers

Order: CharadriiformesFamily: Laridae

Laridae is a family of medium to large seabirds and includes gulls, terns, and skimmers. Gulls are typically grey or white, often with black markings on the head or wings. They have stout, longish bills, and webbed feet. Terns are a group of generally medium to large seabirds typically with grey or white plumage, often with black markings on the head. Most terns hunt fish by diving but some pick insects off the surface of fresh water. Terns are generally long-lived birds, with several species known to live in excess of 30 years. Skimmers are a small family of tropical tern-like birds. They have an elongated lower mandible which they use to feed by flying low over the water surface and skimming the water for small fish.

Black-legged kittiwake, Rissa tridactyla 
Red-legged kittiwake, Rissa brevirostris (A) 
Ivory gull, Pagophila eburnea 
Sabine's gull, Xema sabini 
Bonaparte's gull, Chroicocephalus philadelphia 
Black-headed gull, Chroicocephalus ridibundus 
Little gull, Hydrocoloeus minutus 
Ross's gull, Rhodostethia rosea 
Laughing gull, Leucophaeus atricilla 
Franklin's gull, Leucophaeus pipixcan 
Black-tailed gull, Larus crassirostris (A) 
Heermann's gull, Larus heermanni 
Common gull, Larus canus (A) LC
Short-billed gull,Larus brachyrhynchus 
Ring-billed gull, Larus delawarensis 
Western gull, Larus occidentalis 
California gull, Larus californicus 
Herring gull, Larus argentatus 
Yellow-legged gull, Larus cachinnans (A) 
Iceland gull, Larus glaucoides 
Lesser black-backed gull, Larus fuscus 
Slaty-backed gull, Larus schistisagus (A) 
Glaucous-winged gull, Larus glaucescens 
Glaucous gull, Larus hyperboreus 
Great black-backed gull, Larus marinus 
Kelp gull, Larus dominicanus (A) 
Sooty tern, Onychoprion fuscatus (A) 
Bridled tern, Onychoprion anaethetus (A) 
Aleutian tern, Onychoprion aleuticus (A) 
Least tern, Sternula antillarum (A) 
Gull-billed tern, Gelochelidon nilotica (A) 
Caspian tern, Hydroprogne caspia 
Black tern, Chlidonias niger 
White-winged tern, Chlidonias leucopterus (A) 
Roseate tern, Sterna dougallii 
Common tern, Sterna hirundo 
Arctic tern, Sterna paradisaea 
Forster's tern, Sterna forsteri 
Royal tern, Thalasseus maximus (A) 
Sandwich tern, Thalasseus sandvicensis (A) 
Elegant tern, Thalasseus elegans (A) 
Black skimmer, Rynchops niger (A)

Tropicbirds
Order: PhaethontiformesFamily: Phaethontidae

Tropicbirds are slender white birds of tropical oceans with exceptionally long central tail feathers. Their long wings have black markings, as does the head.

White-tailed tropicbird, Phaethon lepturus (A) 
Red-billed tropicbird, Phaethon aethereus (A) 
Red-tailed tropicbird, Phaethon rubricauda (A)

Loons 

Order: GaviiformesFamily: Gaviidae

Loons are aquatic birds the size of a large duck, to which they are unrelated. Their plumage is largely grey or black, and they have spear-shaped bills. Loons swim well and fly adequately, but, because their legs are placed towards the rear of the body, are almost helpless on land.

Red-throated loon, Gavia stellata 
Arctic loon, Gavia arctica (A) 
Pacific loon, Gavia pacifica 
Common loon, Gavia immer 
Yellow-billed loon, Gavia adamsii

Albatrosses
Order: ProcellariiformesFamily: Diomedeidae

The albatrosses are amongst the largest of flying birds, and the great albatrosses from the genus Diomedea have the largest wingspans of any extant birds.

Yellow-nosed albatross, Thalassar chlororhynchus (A) 
Black-browed albatross, Thalassarche melanophris (A) 
Laysan albatross, Phoebastria immutabilis 
Black-footed albatross, Phoebastria nigripes 
Short-tailed albatross, Phoebastria albatrus

Southern storm-petrels

Order: ProcellariiformesFamily: Oceanitidae

The storm-petrels are the smallest seabirds, relatives of the petrels, feeding on planktonic crustaceans and small fish picked from the surface, typically while hovering. The flight is fluttering and sometimes bat-like. Until 2018, this family's three species were included with the other storm-petrels in family Hydrobatidae.

Wilson's storm-petrel, Oceanites oceanicus 
White-faced storm-petrel, (A) Pelagodroma marina

Northern storm-petrels
Order: ProcellariiformesFamily: Hydrobatidae

Though the members of this family are similar in many respects to the southern storm-petrels, including their general appearance and habits, there are enough genetic differences to warrant their placement in a separate family.

European storm-petrel, Hydrobates pelagicus (A) 
Fork-tailed storm-petrel, Hydrobates furcatus 
Leach's storm-petrel, Hydrobates leucorhous 
Band-rumped storm-petrel, Hydrobates castro (A)

Shearwaters and petrels

Order: ProcellariiformesFamily: Procellariidae

The procellariids are the main group of medium-sized "true petrels", characterized by united nostrils with medium septum and a long outer functional primary.

Northern fulmar, Fulmarus glacialis 
Trindade petrel, Pterodroma arminjoniana (VU)
Murphy's petrel, Pterodroma ultima (A) 
Mottled petrel, Pterodroma inexpectata (A) 
Bermuda petrel, Pterodroma cahow (A) 
Black-capped petrel, Pterodroma hasitata (A) 
Hawaiian petrel, Pterodroma sandwichensis (A)  
Fea's petrel, Pterodroma feae (A) 
Cook's petrel, Pterodroma cookii (A) 
Streaked shearwater, Calonectris leucomelas (A) 
Cory's shearwater, Calonectris diomedea 
Buller's shearwater, Ardenna bulleri 
Short-tailed shearwater, Ardenna tenuirostris 
Sooty shearwater, Ardenna griseus 
Great shearwater, Ardenna gravis 
Pink-footed shearwater, Ardenna creatopus 
Flesh-footed shearwater, Ardenna carneipes (A) 
Manx shearwater, Puffinus puffinus 
Black-vented shearwater, Puffinus opisthomelas (A) 
Audubon's shearwater, Puffinus lherminieri (A) 
Barolo shearwater, Puffinus baroli (A) (Not yet assessed by the IUCN)

Storks
Order: CiconiiformesFamily: Ciconiidae

Storks are large, heavy, long-legged, long-necked wading birds with long stout bills and wide wingspans. They lack the powder down that other wading birds such as herons, spoonbills and ibises use to clean off fish slime. Storks lack a pharynx and are mute.

Wood stork, Mycteria americana (A)

Frigatebirds
Order: SuliformesFamily: Fregatidae

Frigatebirds are large seabirds usually found over tropical oceans. They are large, black, or black-and-white birds, with long wings and deeply forked tails. The males have coloured inflatable throat pouches. They do not swim or walk and cannot take off from a flat surface. Having the largest wingspan-to-body-weight ratio of any bird, they are essentially aerial, able to stay aloft for more than a week.

Magnificent frigatebird, Fregata magnificens (A)

Boobies and gannets

Order: SuliformesFamily: Sulidae

The sulids comprise the gannets and boobies. Both groups are medium-large coastal seabirds that plunge-dive for fish.

Masked booby, Sula dactylatra (A) 
Nazca booby, Sula granti (A) 
Blue-footed booby, Sula nebouxii (A) 
Brown booby, Sula leucogaster (A) 
Red-footed booby, Sula sula (A) 
Northern gannet, Morus bassanus

Anhingas
Order: SuliformesFamily: Anhingidae

Anhingas are cormorant-like water birds with very long necks and long, straight beaks. They are fish eaters which often swim with only their neck above water.

Anhinga, Anhinga anhinga (A)

Cormorants and shags
Order: SuliformesFamily: Phalacrocoracidae

Cormorants are medium-to-large aquatic birds, usually with mainly dark plumage and areas of coloured skin on the face. The bill is long, thin, and sharply hooked. Their feet are four-toed and webbed.

Brandt's cormorant, Urile penicillatus 
Red-faced cormorant, Urile urile (A) 
Pelagic cormorant, Urile pelagicus 
Great cormorant, Phalacrocorax carbo 
Double-crested cormorant, Nannopterum auritum 
Neotropic cormorant, Nannopterum brasilianum (A)

Pelicans

Order: PelecaniformesFamily: Pelecanidae

Pelicans are very large water birds with a distinctive pouch under their beak. Like other birds in the order Pelecaniformes, they have four webbed toes.

American white pelican, Pelecanus erythrorhynchos 
Brown pelican, Pelecanus occidentalis

Herons, egrets, and bitterns

Order: PelecaniformesFamily: Ardeidae

The family Ardeidae contains the herons, egrets, and bitterns. Herons and egrets are medium to large wading birds with long necks and legs. Bitterns tend to be shorter necked and more secretive. Members of Ardeidae fly with their necks retracted, unlike other long-necked birds such as storks, ibises, and spoonbills.

American bittern, Botaurus lentiginosus 
Least bittern, Ixobrychus exilis 
Great blue heron, Ardea herodias 
Grey heron, Ardea cinerea (A) 
Great egret, Ardea alba 
Little egret, Egretta garzetta (A) 
Western reef-heron, Egretta gularis (A) 
Snowy egret, Egretta thula 
Little blue heron, Egretta caerulea (A) 
Tricolored heron, Egretta tricolor (A) 
Reddish egret, Egretta rufescens (A) 
Cattle egret, Bubulcus ibis 
Green heron, Butorides virescens 
Black-crowned night-heron, Nycticorax nycticorax 
Yellow-crowned night-heron, Nyctanassa violacea (A)

Ibises and spoonbills
Order: PelecaniformesFamily: Threskiornithidae

Members of this family have long, broad wings, are strong fliers and, rather surprisingly, given their size and weight, very capable soarers. The body tends to be elongated, the neck more so, with rather long legs. The bill is also long, decurved in the case of the ibises, straight and distinctively flattened in the spoonbills.

White ibis, Eudocimus albus (A) 
Glossy ibis, Plegadis falcinellus 
White-faced ibis, Plegadis chihi 
Roseate spoonbill, Ajaia ajaja (A)

New World vultures

Order: CathartiformesFamily: Cathartidae

The New World vultures are not closely related to Old World vultures, but superficially resemble them because of convergent evolution. Like the Old World vultures, they are scavengers. However, unlike Old World vultures, which find carcasses by sight, New World vultures have a good sense of smell with which they locate carcasses.

California condor, Gymnogyps californianus (Ex) 
Black vulture, Coragyps atratus (A) 
Turkey vulture, Cathartes aura

Osprey
Order: AccipitriformesFamily: Pandionidae

Pandionidae is a family of fish-eating birds of prey possessing a very large, powerful hooked beak for tearing flesh from their prey, strong legs, powerful talons, and keen eyesight. The family is monotypic.

Osprey, Pandion haliaetus

Hawks, eagles, and kites

Order: AccipitriformesFamily: Accipitridae

Accipitridae is a family of birds of prey, which includes hawks, eagles, kites, harriers and Old World vultures. These birds have very large powerful hooked beaks for tearing flesh from their prey, strong legs, powerful talons, and keen eyesight.

White-tailed kite, Elanus leucurus (A) 
Swallow-tailed kite, Elanoides forficatus (A) 
Golden eagle, Aquila chrysaetos 
Northern harrier, Circus hudsonius (Not yet assessed by the IUCN)
Sharp-shinned hawk, Accipiter striatus 
Cooper's hawk, Accipiter cooperii 
Northern goshawk, Accipiter gentilis 
Bald eagle, Haliaeetus leucocephalus 
Steller's sea-eagle, Haliaeetus pelagicus (A) 
Mississippi kite, Ictinia mississippiensis (A) 
Red-shouldered hawk, Buteo lineatus 
Broad-winged hawk, Buteo platypterus 
Swainson's hawk, Buteo swainsoni 
Zone-tailed hawk, Buteo albonotatus (A) 
Red-tailed hawk, Buteo jamaicensis 
Rough-legged hawk, Buteo lagopus 
Ferruginous hawk, Buteo regalis

Barn-owls
Order: StrigiformesFamily: Tytonidae

Barn-owls are medium to large owls with large heads and characteristic heart-shaped faces. They have long, strong legs with powerful talons.

Barn owl, Tyto alba

Owls

Order: StrigiformesFamily: Strigidae

Typical owls are small to large solitary nocturnal birds of prey. They have large forward-facing eyes and ears, a hawk-like beak, and a conspicuous circle of feathers around each eye called a facial disk.

Flammulated owl, Psiloscops flammeolus 
Western screech-owl, Megascops kennicottii 
Eastern screech-owl, Megascops asio 
Great horned owl, Bubo virginianus 
Snowy owl, Bubo scandiacus 
Northern hawk owl, Surnia ulula 
Northern pygmy-owl, Glaucidium gnoma 
Burrowing owl, Athene cunicularia 
Spotted owl, Strix occidentalis 
Barred owl, Strix varia 
Great grey owl, Strix nebulosa 
Long-eared owl, Asio otus 
Short-eared owl, Asio flammeus 
Boreal owl, Aegolius funereus 
Northern saw-whet owl, Aegolius acadicus

Kingfishers
Order: CoraciiformesFamily: Alcedinidae

Kingfishers are medium-sized birds with large heads, long, pointed bills, short legs, and stubby tails.

Belted kingfisher, Megaceryle alcyon

Woodpeckers

Order: PiciformesFamily: Picidae

Woodpeckers are small to medium-sized birds with chisel-like beaks, short legs, stiff tails, and long tongues used for capturing insects. Some species have feet with two toes pointing forward and two backward, while several species have only three toes. Many woodpeckers have the habit of tapping noisily on tree trunks with their beaks.

Lewis's woodpecker, Melanerpes lewis 
Red-headed woodpecker, Melanerpes erythrocephalus  
Acorn woodpecker, Melanerpes formicivorus (A) 
Red-bellied woodpecker, Melanerpes carolinus 
Williamson's sapsucker, Sphyrapicus thyroideus 
Yellow-bellied sapsucker, Sphyrapicus varius 
Red-naped sapsucker, Sphyrapicus nuchalis 
Red-breasted sapsucker, Sphyrapicus ruber 
American three-toed woodpecker, Picoides dorsalis 
Black-backed woodpecker, Picoides arcticus 
Downy woodpecker, Dryobates pubescens 
Hairy woodpecker, Dryobates villosus 
White-headed woodpecker, Dryobates albolarvatus 
Northern flicker, Colaptes auratus 
Pileated woodpecker, Dryocopus pileatus

Falcons and caracaras

Order: FalconiformesFamily: Falconidae

Falconidae is a family of diurnal birds of prey, notably the falcons and caracaras. They differ from hawks, eagles, and kites in that they kill with their beaks instead of their talons.

Crested caracara, Caracara plancus (A) 
Eurasian kestrel, Falco tinnunculus (A) 
American kestrel, Falco sparverius 
Merlin, Falco columbarius 
Gyrfalcon, Falco rusticolus 
Peregrine falcon, Falco peregrinus 
Prairie falcon, Falco mexicanus

Tyrant flycatchers

Order: PasseriformesFamily: Tyrannidae

Tyrant flycatchers are Passerine birds which occur throughout North and South America. They superficially resemble the Old World flycatchers, but are more robust and have stronger bills. They do not have the sophisticated vocal capabilities of the songbirds. Most, but not all, are rather plain. As the name implies, most are insectivorous.

Small-billed elaenia, Elaenia parvirostris (A) 
Ash-throated flycatcher, Myiarchus cinerascens (A) 
Great crested flycatcher, Myiarchus crinitus 
Great kiskadee, Pitangus sulphuratus (A) 
Sulphur-bellied flycatcher, Myiodynastes luteiventris (A) 
Variegated flycatcher, Empidonomus varius (A) 
Tropical kingbird, Tyrannus melancholicus (A) 
Cassin's kingbird, Tyrannus vociferans (A) 
Thick-billed kingbird, Tyrannus crassirostris (A) 
Western kingbird, Tyrannus verticalis 
Eastern kingbird, Tyrannus tyrannus 
Grey kingbird, Tyrannus dominicensis (A) 
Scissor-tailed flycatcher, Tyrannus forficatus (A) 
Fork-tailed flycatcher, Tyrannus savana (A) 
Olive-sided flycatcher, Contopus cooperi 
Western wood-pewee, Contopus sordidulus 
Eastern wood-pewee, Contopus virens 
Yellow-bellied flycatcher, Empidonax flaviventris 
Acadian flycatcher, Empidonax virescens 
Alder flycatcher, Empidonax alnorum 
Willow flycatcher, Empidonax traillii 
Least flycatcher, Empidonax minimus 
Hammond's flycatcher, Empidonax hammondii 
Grey flycatcher, Empidonax wrightii (A) 
Dusky flycatcher, Empidonax oberholseri 
Pacific-slope flycatcher, Empidonax difficilis 
Cordilleran flycatcher, Empidonax occidentalis (A) 
Black phoebe, Sayornis nigricans (A) 
Eastern phoebe, Sayornis phoebe 
Say's phoebe, Sayornis saya 
Vermilion flycatcher, Pyrocephalus rubinus (A)

Vireos, shrike-babblers, and erpornis
Order: PasseriformesFamily: Vireonidae

The vireos are a group of small to medium-sized passerine birds. They are typically greenish in colour and resemble wood warblers, apart from their heavier bills.

Black-capped vireo, Vireo atricapilla (A) 
White-eyed vireo, Vireo griseus 
Bell's vireo, Vireo bellii (A) 
Hutton's vireo, Vireo huttoni 
Yellow-throated vireo, Vireo flavifrons 
Cassin's vireo, Vireo cassinii 
Blue-headed vireo, Vireo solitarius 
Plumbeous vireo, Vireo plumbeus (A) 
Philadelphia vireo, Vireo philadelphicus 
Warbling vireo, Vireo gilvus 
Red-eyed vireo, Vireo olivaceus 
Yellow-green vireo, Vireo flavoviridis (A)

Shrikes

Order: PasseriformesFamily: Laniidae

Shrikes are passerine birds known for their habit of catching other birds and small animals and impaling the uneaten portions of their bodies on thorns. A shrike's beak is hooked, like that of a typical bird of prey.

Brown shrike, Lanius cristatus (A) 
Red-backed shrike, Lanius collurio (A) 
Loggerhead shrike, Lanius ludovicianus 
Northern shrike, Lanius borealis

Crows, jays, and magpies

Order: PasseriformesFamily: Corvidae

The family Corvidae includes crows, ravens, jays, choughs, magpies, treepies, nutcrackers, and ground jays. Corvids are above average in size among the Passeriformes, and some of the larger species show high levels of intelligence.

Canada jay, Perisoreus canadensis 
Pinyon jay, Gymnorhinus cyanocephalus (A) 
Steller's jay, Cyanocitta stelleri 
Blue jay, Cyanocitta cristata 
California scrub-jay, Aphelocoma californica (A) (Not yet assessed by the IUCN)
Woodhouse's scrub-jay, Aphelocoma woodhouseii (A) (Not yet assessed by the IUCN)
Clark's nutcracker, Nucifraga columbiana 
Black-billed magpie, Pica hudsonia 
Eurasian jackdaw, Corvus monedula (A) 
American crow, Corvus brachyrhynchos 
Fish crow, Corvus ossifragus (A) 
Chihuahuan raven, Corvus cryptoleucus (A) 
Common raven, Corvus corax

Tits, chickadees, and titmice
Order: PasseriformesFamily: Paridae

The Paridae are mainly small stocky woodland species with short stout bills. Some have crests. They are adaptable birds, with a mixed diet including seeds and insects.

Carolina chickadee, Poecile carolinensis 
Black-capped chickadee, Poecile atricapillus 
Mountain chickadee, Poecile gambeli 
Chestnut-backed chickadee, Poecile rufescens 
Boreal chickadee, Poecile hudsonicus 
Grey-headed chickadee, Poecile cinctus 
Tufted titmouse, Baeolophus bicolor

Larks
Order: PasseriformesFamily: Alaudidae

Larks are small terrestrial birds with often extravagant songs and display flights. Most larks are fairly dull in appearance. They feed on insects and seeds.

Eurasian skylark, Alauda arvensis 
Horned lark, Eremophila alpestris

Swallows
Order: PasseriformesFamily: Hirundinidae

The family Hirundinidae is adapted to aerial feeding. They have a slender streamlined body, long pointed wings, and a short bill with a wide gape. The feet are adapted to perching rather than walking, and the front toes are partially joined at the base.

Bank swallow, Riparia riparia 
Tree swallow, Tachycineta bicolor 
Violet-green swallow, Tachycineta thalassina 
Northern rough-winged swallow, Stelgidopteryx serripennis 
Purple martin, Progne subis 
Barn swallow, Hirundo rustica 
Cliff swallow, Petrochelidon pyrrhonota 
Cave swallow, Petrochelidon fulva

Long-tailed tits
Order: PasseriformesFamily: Aegithalidae

The long-tailed tits are a family of small passerine birds. Their plumage is typically dull grey or brown in colour. There is only one North American representative of this primarily Palearctic family.

Bushtit, Psaltriparus minimus

Leaf warblers
Order: PasseriformesFamily: Phylloscopidae

Leaf warblers are a family of small insectivorous birds found mostly in Eurasia and ranging into Wallacea and Africa. The Arctic warbler breeds east into Alaska. The species are of various sizes, often green-plumaged above and yellow below, or more subdued with greyish-green to greyish-brown colours.

Yellow-browed warbler, Phylloscopus inornatus (A) 
Arctic warbler, Phylloscopus borealis (A) 
Kamchatka leaf warbler, Phylloscopus examinandus (A)

Kinglets
Order: PasseriformesFamily: Regulidae

The kinglets are a small family of birds which resemble the titmice. They are very small, insectivorous birds. The adults have coloured crowns, giving rise to their name.

Ruby-crowned kinglet, Corthylio calendula 
Golden-crowned kinglet, Regulus satrapa

Waxwings
Order: PasseriformesFamily: Bombycillidae

The waxwings are a group of birds with soft silky plumage and unique red tips to some of the wing feathers. In the Bohemian and cedar waxwings, these tips look like sealing wax and give the group its name. These are arboreal birds of northern forests. They live on insects in the summer and berries in winter.

Bohemian waxwing, Bombycilla garrulus 
Cedar waxwing, Bombycilla cedrorum

Silky-flycatchers
Order: PasseriformesFamily: Ptiliogonatidae

The silky flycatchers are a small family of passerine birds which occur mainly in Central America. They are related to waxwings and most species have small crests.

Phainopepla, Phainopepla nitens (A)

Nuthatches
Order: PasseriformesFamily: Sittidae

Nuthatches are small woodland birds. They have the unusual ability to climb down trees head first, unlike other birds, which can only go upwards. Nuthatches have large heads, short tails, and powerful bills and feet.

Red-breasted nuthatch, Sitta canadensis 
White-breasted nuthatch, Sitta carolinensis 
Pygmy nuthatch, Sitta pygmaea

Treecreepers 
Order: PasseriformesFamily: Certhiidae

Treecreepers are small woodland birds, brown above and white below. They have thin, down-pointed, curved bills, which they use to extricate insects from bark. They have stiff tail feathers, like woodpeckers, which they use to support themselves vertically on trees.

Brown creeper, Certhia americana

Gnatcatchers
Order: PasseriformesFamily: Polioptilidae

These dainty birds resemble Old World warblers in their structure and habits, moving restlessly through the foliage seeking insects. The gnatcatchers are mainly soft bluish grey in colour and have the typical insectivore's long, sharp bill. Many species have distinctive black head patterns (especially males) and long, regularly cocked, black-and-white tails.

Blue-grey gnatcatcher, Polioptila caerulea

Wrens
Order: PasseriformesFamily: Troglodytidae

Wrens are small and inconspicuous birds, except for their loud songs. They have short wings and thin down-turned bills. Several species often hold their tails upright. All are insectivorous.

Rock wren, Salpinctes obsoletus 
Canyon wren, Catherpes mexicanus 
House wren, Troglodytes aedon 
Pacific wren, Troglodytes pacificus 
Winter wren, Troglodytes hiemalis 
Sedge wren, Cistothorus platensis 
Marsh wren, Cistothorus palustris 
Carolina wren, Thryothorus ludovicianus 
Bewick's wren, Thryomanes bewickii

Mockingbirds and thrashers
Order: PasseriformesFamily: Mimidae

The mimids are a family of passerine birds which includes thrashers, mockingbirds, tremblers, and the New World catbirds. These birds are notable for their vocalization, especially their remarkable ability to mimic a wide variety of birds and other sounds heard outdoors. The species tend towards dull greys and browns in their appearance.

Grey catbird, Dumetella carolinensis 
Curve-billed thrasher, Toxostoma curvirostre (A) 
Brown thrasher, Toxostoma rufum 
Bendire's thrasher, Toxostoma bendirei (A) 
Sage thrasher, Oreoscoptes montanus 
Northern mockingbird, Mimus polyglottos

Starlings

Order: PasseriformesFamily: Sturnidae

Starlings and mynas are small to medium-sized Old World passerine birds with strong feet. Their flight is strong and direct and most are very gregarious. Their preferred habitat is fairly open country, and they eat insects and fruit. The plumage of several species is dark with a metallic sheen.

European starling, Sturnus vulgaris (I) 
Crested myna, Acridotheres cristatellus (I) (Ex)

Dippers
Order: PasseriformesFamily: Cinclidae

Dippers are named for their bobbing or dipping movements. They are unique among passerines for their ability to dive and swim underwater.

American dipper, Cinclus mexicanus

Thrushes and allies

Order: PasseriformesFamily: Turdidae

The thrushes are a group of passerine birds that occur mainly but not exclusively in the Old World. They are plump, soft plumaged, small to medium-sized insectivores or sometimes omnivores, often feeding on the ground. Many have attractive songs.

Eastern bluebird, Sialia sialis 
Western bluebird, Sialia mexicana 
Mountain bluebird, Sialia currucoides 
Townsend's solitaire, Myadestes townsendi 
Veery, Catharus fuscescens 
Grey-cheeked thrush, Catharus minimus 
Bicknell's thrush, Catharus bicknelli 
Swainson's thrush, Catharus ustulatus 
Hermit thrush, Catharus guttatus 
Wood thrush, Hylocichla mustelina 
Mistle thrush, Turdus viscivorus (A) 
Eurasian blackbird, Turdus merula (A) 
Dusky thrush, Turdus eunomus (A) 
Fieldfare, Turdus pilaris (A) 
Redwing, Turdus iliacus (A) 
Song thrush, Turdus philomelos (A) 
American robin, Turdus migratorius 
Varied thrush, Ixoreus naevius

Old World flycatchers
Order: PasseriformesFamily: Muscicapidae

This a large family of small passerine birds restricted to the Old World. Species below only occurs in Canada as vagrants. The appearance of these birds is highly varied, but they mostly have weak songs and harsh calls.

Siberian rubythroat, Luscinia calliope (A) 
Bluethroat, Luscinia svecica 
Siberian blue robin, Luscinia cyane (A) 
Red-flanked bluetail, Tarsiger cyanurus (A) 
Blue rock-thrush, Monticola solitarius (A) LC
Siberian stonechat, Saxicola maurus (A) 
Northern wheatear, Oenanthe oenanthe

Accentors
Order: PasseriformesFamily: Prunellidae

Accentors are small, fairly drab species superficially similar, but unrelated to, sparrows. However, accentors have thin sharp bills, reflecting their diet of insects in summer, augmented with seeds and berries in winter.

Siberian accentor, Prunella montanella (A)

Old World sparrows
Order: PasseriformesFamily: Passeridae

Old World sparrows are small passerine birds. In general, sparrows tend to be small plump brownish or greyish birds with short tails and short powerful beaks. Sparrows are seed eaters, but they also consume small insects.

House sparrow, Passer domesticus (I) 
Eurasian tree sparrow, Passer montanus (I) (A)

Wagtails and pipits
Order: PasseriformesFamily: Motacillidae

Motacillidae is a family of small passerine birds with medium to long tails. They include the wagtails, longclaws, and pipits. They are slender ground-feeding insectivores of open country.

Eastern yellow wagtail, Motacilla tschutschensis 
Citrine wagtail, Motacilla citreola (A) 
Grey wagtail, Motacilla cinerea (A) 
White wagtail, Motacilla alba (A) 
Red-throated pipit, Anthus cervinus (A) 
American pipit, Anthus rubescens 
Sprague's pipit, Anthus spragueii

Finches, euphonias, and allies
Order: PasseriformesFamily: Fringillidae

Finches are seed-eating passerine birds that are small to moderately large and have a strong beak, usually conical and in some species very large. All have twelve tail feathers and nine primaries. These birds have a bouncing flight with alternating bouts of flapping and gliding on closed wings, and most sing well.

Common chaffinch, Fringilla coelebs (A) 
Brambling, Fringilla montifringilla (A) 
Evening grosbeak, Coccothraustes vespertinus 
Hawfinch, Coccothraustes coccothraustes (A) 
Pine grosbeak, Pinicola enucleator 
Grey-crowned rosy-finch, Leucosticte tephrocotis 
House finch, Haemorhous mexicanus   
Purple finch, Haemorhous purpureus 
Cassin's finch, Haemorhous cassinii 
Common redpoll, Acanthis flammea 
Hoary redpoll, Acanthis hornemanni (Not yet assessed by the IUCN)
Red crossbill, Loxia curvirostra 
White-winged crossbill, Loxia leucoptera 
Pine siskin, Spinus pinus 
Lesser goldfinch, Spinus psaltria (A) 
American goldfinch, Spinus tristis 
Oriental greenfinch, Chloris sinica (A)

Longspurs and snow buntings
Order: PasseriformesFamily: Calcariidae

The Calcariidae are a group of passerine birds which had been traditionally grouped with the New World sparrows, but differ in a number of respects and are usually found in open grassy areas.

Lapland longspur, Calcarius lapponicus 
Chestnut-collared longspur, Calcarius ornatus 
Smith's longspur, Calcarius pictus 
Thick-billed longspur, Rhynchophanes mccownii 
Snow bunting, Plectrophenax nivalis 
McKay's bunting, Plectrophenax hyperboreus (A)

Old World buntings
Order: PasseriformesFamily: Emberizidae

Emberizidae is a family of passerine birds containing a single genus. Until 2017, the New World sparrows (Passerellidae) were also considered part of this family.

Pine bunting, Emberiza leucocephalos (A) 
Little bunting, Emberiza pusilla (A) 
Rustic bunting, Emberiza rustica (A) 
Yellow-breasted bunting, Emberiza aureola (A)

New World sparrows

Order: PasseriformesFamily: Passerellidae

Until 2017, these species were considered part of the family Emberizidae. Most of the species are known as sparrows, but these birds are not closely related to the Old World sparrows which are in the family Passeridae. Many of these have distinctive head patterns.

Cassin's sparrow, Peucaea cassinii (A) 
Bachman's sparrow, Peucaea aestivalis (A) 
Grasshopper sparrow, Ammodramus savannarum 
Black-throated sparrow, Amphispiza bilineata (A) 
Lark sparrow, Chondestes grammacus 
Lark bunting, Calamospiza melanocorys 
Chipping sparrow, Spizella passerina 
Clay-coloured sparrow, Spizella pallida 
Field sparrow, Spizella pusilla 
Brewer's sparrow, Spizella breweri 
Fox sparrow, Passerella iliaca 
American tree sparrow, Spizelloides arborea 
Dark-eyed junco, Junco hyemalis 
White-crowned sparrow, Zonotrichia leucophrys 
Golden-crowned sparrow, Zonotrichia atricapilla 
Harris's sparrow, Zonotrichia querula 
White-throated sparrow, Zonotrichia albicollis 
Sagebrush sparrow, Artemisiospiza nevadensis (A) 
Bell's sparrow, Artemisiospiza belli (A) 
Vesper sparrow, Pooecetes gramineus 
LeConte's sparrow, Ammospiza leconteii 
Seaside sparrow, Ammospiza maritima (A) 
Nelson's sparrow, Ammospiza nelsoni 
Saltmarsh sparrow, Ammospiza caudacuta (A) EN
Baird's sparrow, Centronyx bairdii 
Henslow's sparrow, Centronyx henslowii 
Savannah sparrow, Passerculus sandwichensis 
Song sparrow, Melospiza melodia 
Lincoln's sparrow, Melospiza lincolnii 
Swamp sparrow, Melospiza georgiana 
Green-tailed towhee, Pipilo chlorurus (A) 
Spotted towhee, Pipilo maculatus 
Eastern towhee, Pipilo erythrophthalmus

Yellow-breasted chat
Order: PasseriformesFamily: Icteriidae

This species was historically placed in the wood-warblers (Parulidae) but nonetheless most authorities were unsure if it belonged there. It was placed in its own family in 2017.

Yellow-breasted chat, Icteria virens

Troupials and allies

Order: PasseriformesFamily: Icteridae

The icterids are a group of small to medium-sized, often colourful passerine birds restricted to the New World and include the grackles, New World blackbirds, and New World orioles. Most species have black as a predominant plumage colour, often enlivened by yellow, orange, or red.

Yellow-headed blackbird, Xanthocephalus xanthocephalus 
Bobolink, Dolichonyx oryzivorus 
Eastern meadowlark, Sturnella magna 
Western meadowlark, Sturnella neglecta 
Orchard oriole, Icterus spurius 
Hooded oriole, Icterus cucullatus (A) 
Bullock's oriole, Icterus bullockii 
Baltimore oriole, Icterus galbula 
Scott's oriole, Icterus parisorum (A) 
Red-winged blackbird, Agelaius phoeniceus 
Shiny cowbird, Molothrus bonariensis (A) 
Bronzed cowbird, Molothrus aeneus (A) 
Brown-headed cowbird, Molothrus ater 
Rusty blackbird, Euphagus carolinus 
Brewer's blackbird, Euphagus cyanocephalus 
Common grackle, Quiscalus quiscula 
Great-tailed grackle, Quiscalus mexicanus (A)

New World warblers

Order: PasseriformesFamily: Parulidae

The wood warblers are a group of small, often colourful passerine birds restricted to the New World. Most are arboreal, but some are more terrestrial. Most members of this family are insectivores.

Ovenbird, Seiurus aurocapilla 
Worm-eating warbler, Helmitheros vermivorus (A) 
Louisiana waterthrush, Parkesia motacilla 
Northern waterthrush, Parkesia noveboracensis 
Golden-winged warbler, Vermivora chrysoptera 
Blue-winged warbler, Vermivora cyanoptera 
Black-and-white warbler, Mniotilta varia 
Prothonotary warbler, Protonotaria citrea 
Swainson's warbler, Limnothlypis swainsonii (A) 
Tennessee warbler, Leiothlypis peregrina 
Orange-crowned warbler, Leiothlypis celata 
Lucy's warbler, Leiothlypis luciae (A) 
Nashville warbler, Leiothlypis ruficapilla 
Virginia's warbler, Leiothlypis virginiae (A) 
Connecticut warbler, Oporornis agilis 
MacGillivray's warbler, Geothlypis tolmiei 
Mourning warbler, Geothlypis philadelphia 
Kentucky warbler, Geothlypis formosa (A) 
Common yellowthroat, Geothlypis trichas 
Hooded warbler, Setophaga citrina 
American redstart, Setophaga ruticilla 
Kirtland's warbler, Setophaga kirtlandii (A) 
Cape May warbler, Setophaga tigrina 
Cerulean warbler, Setophaga cerulea 
Northern parula, Setophaga americana 
Magnolia warbler, Setophaga magnolia 
Bay-breasted warbler, Setophaga castanea 
Blackburnian warbler, Setophaga fusca 
Yellow warbler, Setophaga aestiva 
Chestnut-sided warbler, Setophaga pensylvanica 
Blackpoll warbler, Setophaga striata 
Black-throated blue warbler, Setophaga caerulescens 
Palm warbler, Setophaga palmarum 
Pine warbler, Setophaga pinus 
Yellow-rumped warbler, Setophaga coronata 
Yellow-throated warbler, Setophaga dominica (A) 
Prairie warbler, Setophaga discolor 
Grace's warbler, Setophaga graciae (A) 
Black-throated grey warbler, Setophaga nigrescens 
Townsend's warbler, Setophaga townsendi 
Hermit warbler, Setophaga occidentalis (A) 
Black-throated green warbler, Setophaga virens 
Canada warbler, Cardellina canadensis 
Wilson's warbler, Cardellina pusilla 
Painted redstart, Myioborus pictus (A)

Cardinals and allies
Order: PasseriformesFamily: Cardinalidae

The cardinals are a family of robust, seed-eating birds with strong bills. They are typically associated with open woodlands. The sexes usually have distinct plumages.

Hepatic tanager, Piranga flava (A) 
Summer tanager, Piranga rubra (A) 
Scarlet tanager, Piranga olivacea 
Western tanager, Piranga ludoviciana 
Northern cardinal, Cardinalis cardinalis 
Pyrrhuloxia, Cardinalis sinuatus (A) 
Rose-breasted grosbeak, Pheucticus ludovicianus 
Black-headed grosbeak, Pheucticus melanocephalus 
Blue grosbeak, Passerina caerulea (A) 
Lazuli bunting, Passerina amoena 
Indigo bunting, Passerina cyanea 
Varied bunting, Passerina versicolor (A) 
Painted bunting, Passerina ciris (A) 
Dickcissel, Spiza americana

Notes

References

See also

List of birds
Lists of birds by region
List of North American birds
List of mammals of Canada
List of amphibians of Canada
List of reptiles of Canada

Birds